Šklėriai is a village in Varėna district municipality, in Alytus County, southeastern Lithuania. 

Šklėriai village is located c.  from Druskininkai,  from Marcinkonys,  from Margionys (the nearest settlement),  from the Belarusian border.

References

Villages in Alytus County
Varėna District Municipality